Cyrtodactylus pseudoquadrivirgatus  is a species of gecko that is endemic to central Vietnam.

References 

Cyrtodactylus
Reptiles described in 2008